Hummer is a surname. Notable people with the surname include:

Craig Hummer (born 1965), American sports announcer
Ian Hummer (born 1990), American basketball player
John Hummer (born 1948), American basketball player
Julia Hummer (born 1980), German actress and singer
T. R. Hummer (born 1950), American poet, writer and academic